Donald Cried is a 2016 American comedy film written and directed by Kristopher Avedisian. The film stars Kristopher Avedisian, Jesse Wakeman, Louisa Krause and Ted Arcidi. The film was released on March 3, 2017, by The Orchard.

Plot
A Manhattanite banker returns to his hometown to pick up an urn and forgets his wallet. He seeks help from a home across the street only to find that it is still occupied by his high school neighbor who prevents him from leaving by appealing to their historic emotional connection.

Cast  
Kristopher Avedisian as Donald 
Jesse Wakeman as Peter
Louisa Krause as Kristin 
Ted Arcidi as Corey 
Shawn Contois as Logan 
Donny Fite as Doug Deflippo
Kate Fitzgerald as Barbara
Jeremy Furtado as Brian Touty 
Patrick Languzzi as Barry 
Robby Morse Levy as Karen

Release 
The film premiered at South by Southwest on March 12, 2016. The film was released on March 3, 2017, by The Orchard.

References

External links
 

2016 films
2016 comedy films
American comedy films
2010s English-language films
2010s American films